Decomposer is the second studio album by American pop punk band The Matches. It was released by Epitaph Records on September 11, 2006 worldwide, on September 12, 2006 in the United States, and in 2016 on vinyl. Audio production was handled by Matt Rad, Mike Green, Ryan Divine & Johnny Genius, Miles Hurwitz, Blink-182's Mark Hoppus, Goldfinger's John Feldmann, Rancid's Tim Armstrong, 311's Nick Hexum, and Bad Religion's Brett Gurewitz.

Decomposer also marks a vast departure from The Matches' previous strict alternative/punk sound and a growth into a more avant-garde and art rock sound. Additionally, many of the lyrical themes explored on Decomposer were resurrected for their next offering, 2008's A Band in Hope.

The album peaked at number 18 on the US Billboard Independent Albums.

Track listing

Personnel
Adapted from AllMusic and Discogs.

Shawn Harris – guitar, vocals, artwork (booklet), design
Jonathan Devoto – guitar, vocals; vibraphone (track 1)
Justin San Souci – bass, vocals
Matt Whalen – drums; toaster percussion (track 3)
Lewis Patzner – cello (track 1)
Anton Patzner – strings, violin and viola (track 1)
Ben Richards – keyboards (track 2)
Dean Butterworth – percussion (track 3), loops (track 5)
Josie Shafer – Fender Rhodes electric piano (track 10)
Ben Kramer – trumpet (track 10)
Matt Radosevich – mixing (tracks: 1–2, 4, 6–12), engineering and production (tracks: 1, 12)
Mike Green – programming, engineering and production (track 2)
John Feldmann – drum programming and additional percussion (track 5), mixing, engineering and production (tracks: 3, 5)
Matt Appleton – engineering (tracks: 3, 5)
Miles Hurwitz – production (track 4), executive production
Johnny Genius – percussion (track 4), engineering (tracks: 4, 8), production (track 8)
Ryan Divine – engineering (tracks: 4, 8), production (track 8)
Marco Martin – additional engineering (track 4)
Mark Hoppus – percussion (track 6), drum programming (track 13), production (tracks 6–7, 13)
Christopher Holmes – drum programming (track 13), engineering (tracks 6–7, 13)
Nicholas Hexum – production (track 9)
Giff Tripp – engineering (track 9)
Jason Walters – additional engineering (track 9)
Tim Armstrong – additional vocals and percussion, production (track 10)
Michael Rosen – engineering (track 10)
Brett Gurewitz – backing vocals, percussion and production (track 11)
Pete Martinez – engineering (track 11)
Chris Roach – additional engineering (track 12)
John Morrical – engineering
Josh Smith – engineering
Tom Baker – mastering
Emilee Seymour – artwork, design

Charts

References

External links

2006 albums
The Matches albums
Epitaph Records albums
Albums produced by Mark Hoppus
Albums produced by John Feldmann
Albums recorded at Sound City Studios